Richard Gasquet defeated Cameron Norrie in the final, 4–6, 6–4, 6–4 to win the men's singles tennis title at the 2023 ASB Classic. It was his 16th ATP Tour singles title, and his first since 2018.

Ugo Humbert was the defending champion from when the event was last held in 2020, but lost in the first round to Christopher Eubanks.

Seeds
The top four seeds received a bye into the second round.

Draw

Finals

Top half

Bottom half

Qualifying

Seeds

Qualifiers

Lucky losers

Qualifying draw

First qualifier

Second qualifier

Third qualifier

Fourth qualifier

References

External links
 Main draw
 Qualifying draw

ASB Classic
2023 Singles